The Tatra T6A2 was a tramcar built by ČKD Tatra between 1985 and 1999.  Having enjoyed widespread success with its previous models among mainly Soviet customers, the T6A2 was quite different in appearance to its predecessors, and was bought extensively by cities in the former East Germany, as well as by Szeged (Hungary) and Sofia (Bulgaria).

Variations

T6A2D/B6A2D
Towards the end of the 1980s, many East German cities required new trams to replace their aging fleets, and it was for this reason that Tatra commissioned the building of three prototype vehicles in 1985.  These vehicles were tested first of all in Prague before being moved to Dresden.  Between 1988 and 1991, 174 of the type were delivered to five East German cities.  Berlin was the largest customer, taking delivery of 177 examples, plus a further 5 which were acquired from Rostock in 1995.

In 2011 six modernized vehicles from Berlin were sold to the swedish city Norrköping as a stop gap measure until new build low floor trams on loan to Stockholms new opened tram line arrived at their new home. All are withdrawn from service now, but there are plans to rebuild one into a maintenance vehicle.

T6A2B
The T6A2B was produced for the Sofia network, of which 40 were delivered in 1991 followed by a second batch of 17 in 1999.

T6A2H
The 13 examples delivered to the Hungarian city of Szeged were labeled T6A2H and entered service in 1997 into a fleet that had previously consisted of exclusively Hungarian-built stock.

Production
256 T6A2 trams and 92 B6A2 trailer cars were produced from 1985 to 1999 and delivered to:

Service today

B6A2D-M
Szeged Transport Company SzKT decided in 2003 to modernize its ageing fleet with refurbished used Tatra tramcars. As part of this program, in 2005 it bought four used B6A2D trailer cars from Rostock in order to convert them to cabless motor cars ("active trailers"). The cars underwent a complete refurbishment and modernization that included renewing the frame and bodywork, replacing the doors from four- to two-winged, as well as the seats. Modern electronic equipment with IGBT transistors was designed by Cegelec. The cars got motorized bogies that match those of type T6A2H, and half-pantographs. The tramcars do not have cabs but they got equipped with auxiliary driving controls at both ends that allow solo operation if needed. The appearance of the refurbished tramcars resembles that of the T6A2H. The modernized B6A2D-M cars are used on line 1 paired with a T6A2H in two-car consists, thus freeing up T6A2H cars that replaced old FVV tramcars (made in 1962) on other lines.

Gallery

References

External links 

Tatra trams
Tram vehicles of Germany
Tram vehicles of Hungary